The Bamberg–Hof railway is a 127 kilometre-long main line that runs through Bavaria in southern Germany. The line runs from Bamberg via Lichtenfels, Kulmbach, Neuenmarkt-Wirsberg and Münchberg to Hof. The section from Hof to Neuenmarkt now forms part of the Saxon-Franconian trunk line.

History
The line is part of the Ludwig South-North Railway from Lindau to Hof. It was built in 3 stages between 1846 and 1848 by the Royal Bavarian State Railways. Its expansion into a double-tracked railway followed in 1891 and the line was electrified from Bamberg to Lichtenfels and beyond that via the Franconian Forest Railway to Saalfeld on 10 May 1939. In the 1960s the second track was lifted between Marktschorgast and Stammbach due to the lack of traffic.

Opening dates
 15 February 1846: Bamberg–Lichtenfels
 15 October 1846: Lichtenfels–Neuenmarkt-Wirsberg
 1 November 1848: Neuenmarkt-Wirsberg–Hof

Description of the route

Shortly after the route leaves Bamberg station the branch line to Scheßlitz (now closed) branches off, as does the main line to Würzburg that runs parallel as far as the heights of Kleingartensiedlung and then swings away to the northwest. From the left, a link line from the Würzburg railway joins the route; which now passes under the A 70 motorway and runs past the western edge of Hallstadt and then parallel to the B 4 before reaching Breitengüßbach. After the station the branch line to Ebern branches off as well as the branch line to Dietersdorf – now closed and dismantled. The line passes under A 73 motorway and runs parallel to the river Main. Passing through the stations of Ebing, Zapfendorf, Ebensfeld (where in future the high-speed line to Erfurt will form a junction) and Bad Staffelstein, the line reaches Lichtenfels.

From Lichtenfels station the line follows the course of the Main as far as Mainleus. In Hochstadt-Marktzeuln the Franconian Forest Railway to Ludwigsstadt and Saalfeld turns off; and at Kulmbach the railway from Thurnau and Bayreuth branches off only a few metres away from where the Schlömener curve link line meets it. Beyond this, the line runs up the Schiefe Ebene to Marktschorgast station, from the end of which it becomes single-tracked as far as Stammbach. Passing Münchberg and Schwarzenbach an der Saale the line reaches Oberkotzau, is united there with the lines from Regensburg and Selb, runs past Moschendorf over the river Saale and finally arrives at the terminus of Hof Hauptbahnhof.

Upgrade or expansion
The line is doubled and electrified from Bamberg to Hochstadt-Marktzeuln. The remaining section to Hof is not electrified but, apart from the single-tracked section from Marktschorgast to Stammbach, is also doubled. The top speed applicable to the route is, in places, up to 160 km/h.

Trains
In 2007, InterCityExpress trains working the Munich–Nuremberg–Leipzig–Berlin–Hamburg route run hourly between Bamberg and Lichtenfels. ICE T tilting trains of Class 411 are used on these services.

RegionalExpress trains on the Nuremberg–Bamberg–Lichtenfels–Sonneberg and Würzburg–Schweinfurt–Bamberg– Lichtenfels–Hof/Bayreuth routes also shuttle hourly on the Bamberg–Lichtenfels section. They are reinforced by Regionalbahn trains on the Nuremberg–Bamberg–Lichtenfels line.

RegionalExpress trains to Sonneberg comprise double-decker trains designed for speeds of up to 160 km/h headed by Class 146 electric locomotives. The line from Würzburg to Hof/Bayreuth is worked by diesel-powered Class 612 tilting trains due to the tight curves on the Schiefe Ebene and the unelectrified stretch from Hochstadt-Marktzeuln to Hof. These are separated or combined during 'system halts' at Wirsberg.

The two-hourly Regionalexpress to Würzburg–Bamberg–Hof/Bayreuth is supplemented by RE trains between Lichtenfels and Hof/Bayreuth to provide an hourly service.

RegionalBahn services on the Lichtenfels–Neuenmarkt-Wirsberg section are provided by Desiro multiples of the Regentalbahn working under contract to DB Regio.

Between Marktschorgast and Hof a few trains of the Franken-Sachsen-Express work the route from Nuremberg via Bayreuth to Dresden.

Future

Nuremberg-Ebensfeld upgrade

The line between Bamberg and Ebensfeld (main article) is to be upgraded to 230 km/h in order to reduce journey times between Munich and Berlin still further. Therefore, the line will be closed from 12 January 2016 until 3 September 2016 between Bamberg and Bad Staffelstein.

Upper Franconia diesel network 
Regionalbahn services on the Lichtenfels–Neuenmarkt-Wirsberg(–Bayreuth) and Münchberg–Hof routes are part of the Bavarian Railway Company’s Upper Franconia Diesel Network announced on 8 February 2008, which is due to start on 12 June 2011 with new vehicles and a better level of service. In addition, direct hourly trains are planned from Weiden via Bayreuth and Lichtenfels to Bad Rodach.

See also 
 Ludwig South-North Railway

External links 
 Route description at Nahverkehr Franken website (private)

References 

Railway lines in Bavaria
Railway lines opened in 1848
1848 establishments in Germany
Buildings and structures in Bamberg
Buildings and structures in Bamberg (district)
Buildings and structures in Kulmbach (district)
Buildings and structures in Bayreuth (district)
Buildings and structures in Hof (district)